EPH receptor A3 (ephrin type-A receptor 3) is a protein that in humans is encoded by the EPHA3 gene.

Function 

This gene belongs to the ephrin receptor subfamily of the protein-tyrosine kinase family. EPH and EPH-related receptors have been implicated in mediating developmental events, particularly in the nervous system. Receptors in the EPH subfamily typically have a single kinase domain and an extracellular region containing a Cys-rich domain and 2 fibronectin type III repeats. The ephrin receptors are divided into 2 groups based on the similarity of their extracellular domain sequences and their affinities for binding ephrin-A and ephrin-B ligands. This gene encodes a protein that binds ephrin-A ligands. Two alternatively spliced transcript variants have been described for this gene.

Interactions 

EPH receptor A3 has been shown to interact with EFNB2 and EFNA5.

References

Further reading 

 
 
 
 
 
 
 
 
 
 
 
 
 
 
 

Tyrosine kinase receptors